Moel Penamnen is a mountain just north of Blaenau Ffestiniog, North Wales and forms part of the Moelwynion.

It may be climbed from the Crimea Pass via Moel Barlwyd, from Blaenau Ffestiniog or Cwm Penamnen to the north. A circular of Cwm Penamnen can be done taking in Y Ro Wen. It may also be combined with its parent peak Manod Mawr, however the pass between these peaks is extremely boggy and there are many mines, air shafts and open quarries in the area.

References

External links
 www.geograph.co.uk : photos of Moel Penamnen and surrounding area

Dolwyddelan
Ffestiniog
Mountains and hills of Conwy County Borough
Mountains and hills of Gwynedd
Mountains and hills of Snowdonia
Hewitts of Wales
Nuttalls